Gottfried Rieger (1 May 1764, Opavice – 13 October 1855, Brno) was an Austrian composer, conductor and teacher, resident for many years at Brno in what is today the Czech Republic.

Life
Rieger was born in 1764 in Tropplowitz, then in the Austrian Empire (now Opavice, part of Město Albrechtice in the Czech Republic). His father owned some land here on the Geppersdorf Estate, and was a musician.

He received music lessons from his father, and played at village festivals. He became at age 13 a member of the private orchestra at Schloss Geppersdorf of Count . Here he learned to play more instruments. On the recommendation of Carl Ditters von Dittersdorf, he studied music theory with Father Damasus Brosmann, rector of the Piarist monastery at Bílá Voda.

He moved to Brno in 1787, where from 1790 he directed the orchestra of the civic theatre, and was a music teacher. Count Haugwitz offered him in 1805 the post of Kapellmeister at his castle at Náměšť nad Oslavou, and he was resident there until 1808; he then returned to Brno, resuming as music teacher and for two more years director of the theatre orchestra. He established a music institute in the city in 1828.

Rieger died in Brno in 1855, aged 91; at his funeral at Brno Cathedral, a requiem composed by him was performed.

Compositions and publications
Compositions include an opera, Das wütende Heer (1787); a Schauspiel mit Gesang, Die Totenglocke um Mitternacht oder Wendelin von Höllenstein (1788); several cantatas, two requiems, piano concertos, songs and chamber music.

A textbook on basso continuo and harmony was published in 1833.

References

External links
 

1764 births
1855 deaths
Austrian composers
18th-century composers
19th-century composers
Silesian-German people
People from Město Albrechtice